Eizō, Eizo or Eizou (written: 栄三, 栄蔵, 英三, 英蔵 or 永三) is a masculine Japanese given name. Notable people with the name include:

, politician
, Japanese painter
, Japanese gymnast
, Japanese musician
, Japanese film director
, Japanese film director, screenwriter, and actor
, Japanese general
, Japanese footballer and manager

See also
Eizo, a Japanese electronics company

Japanese masculine given names